Vainikai is a village in Kėdainiai district municipality, in Kaunas County, in central Lithuania. According to the 2011 census, the village had a population of 283 people. There are former school, medicine station.

History
Vainikai has been established in the former lands of the Karūnava estate during the Interwar. In the Soviet era it was a poultry sovkhoz center.

Demography

References

Villages in Kaunas County
Kėdainiai District Municipality